The Finance & Commerce is a daily newspaper devoted exclusively to business in the Twin Cities (Minneapolis–Saint Paul) and Rochester, Minnesota.

Overview
Founded in 1887, it provides coverage of Twin Cities business news in the areas of real estate, construction, transportation, technology, banking, sustainable energy, health care, and advertising. The newspaper is owned by Gannett, through its BridgeTower Media division. Finance and Commerce is the official legal notice paper for The City of Minneapolis and Hennepin County, Minnesota. Its offices located are in downtown Minneapolis in the former Campbell Mithun Tower, and it has many union employees.

References

External links
Official Website
Ecommerce Platforms
Financial Advisor Complaints

Newspapers published in Minnesota
Business newspapers published in the United States
1887 establishments in Minnesota
Newspapers established in 1887
Gannett publications
Newspapers published in Minneapolis–Saint Paul, Minnesota